Montenegro de Cameros is a municipality located in the midst of the Iberian System mountains, province of Soria, Castile and León, Spain. According to the 2004 census (INE), the municipality has a population of 99 inhabitants.

References

Municipalities in the Province of Soria